The 1984 European Parliament election for the election of the delegation from the Netherlands was held on 14 June 1984. This was the 2nd time the elections had been held for the European elections in the Netherlands.

Sources for everything below:

Numbering of the candidates list 
The official order and names of candidate lists:

| colspan="6" | 
|-
! style="background-color:#E9E9E9;text-align:center;vertical-align:top;" colspan=5 | Lists
|-
!style="background-color:#E9E9E9;text-align:center;" colspan="3"|List
!style="background-color:#E9E9E9;| English translation
!style="background-color:#E9E9E9;| List name (Dutch)
|-
| 1
| 
| style="text-align:left;" | list
| style="text-align:left;" | CDA European People's Party
| style="text-align:left;" | CDA Europese Volkspartij

|-
| 2
| 
| style="text-align:left;" | list
| style="text-align:left;" | Labour Party/European Socialists
| style="text-align:left;" | Partij van de Arbeid/Europese Socialisten

|-
| 3
| 
| style="text-align:left;" | list
| style="text-align:left;" | VVD - European Liberal-Democrats
| style="text-align:left;" | VVD - Europese Liberaal-Democraten

|-
| 4
| 
| style="text-align:left;" | list
| style="text-align:left;" colspan="2" | D'66

|-
| 5
| 
| style="text-align:left;" | list
| style="text-align:left;" | SGP, RPF and GPV
| style="text-align:left;" | SGP, RPF en GPV

|-
| 6
| 
| style="text-align:left;" | list
| style="text-align:left;" | C.P.N. Green Party Netherlands P.P.R. P.S.P.
| style="text-align:left;" | C.P.N. Groene Partij Nederland P.P.R. P.S.P.

|-
| 7
| 
| style="text-align:left;" | list
| style="text-align:left;" | European Greens
| style="text-align:left;" | Europese Groenen

|-
| 8
| 
| style="text-align:left;" | list
| style="text-align:left;" | Centre Party
| style="text-align:left;" | Centrumpartij

|-
| 9
| 
| style="text-align:left;" | list
| style="text-align:left;" | God with Us
| style="text-align:left;" | God met Ons

|-
|}

Candidate lists

CDA European People's Party 

Below is the candidate list for the Christian Democratic Appeal for the 1984 European Parliament election

Elected members are in bold

Labour Party/European Socialists 

Below is the candidate list for the Labour Party for the 1984 European Parliament election

Elected members are in bold

VVD - European Liberal-Democrats 

Below is the candidate list for the People's Party for Freedom and Democracy for the 1984 European Parliament election

Elected members are in bold

D'66 

Below is the candidate list for the Democrats 66 for the 1984 European Parliament election

SGP, RPF and GPV 

Below is the candidate list for SGP, RPF and GPV for the 1984 European Parliament election

Elected members are in bold

C.P.N. Green Party Netherlands P.P.R. P.S.P. 

Below is the candidate list for C.P.N. Green Party Netherlands P.P.R. P.S.P. for the 1984 European Parliament election

Elected members are in bold

European Greens 

Below is the candidate list for The Greens for the 1984 European Parliament election

Centre Party 
Below is the candidate list for the Centre Party for the 1984 European Parliament election

God with Us 

Below is the candidate list for the God with Us for the 1984 European Parliament election

References 

1984
Netherlands